Exilados do Vulcão is a 2013 Brazilian drama film directed by Paula Gaitán. The film premiered at the 2013 Festival de Brasília.

Cast 
Vincenzo Amato as Pedro
Clara Choveaux as Luiza
Bel García as Bel
Lorena Lobato as Lorena
Simone Spoladore as Estela

Reception 
The critic of Folha de S. Paulo wrote: "The filmmaker made a film that comes closest to video art. Perhaps it was the case of exhibiting it in art galleries."

Awards 
2013: Festival de Brasília
Best Picture (won)
Best Sound (Edson Secco / Fábio Andrade) (won)

References

External links 
 

2013 films
2010s Portuguese-language films
Brazilian drama films
2013 drama films
Films scored by Edson Secco